Euchilichthys astatodon is a species of upside-down catfish native to Angola and the Democratic Republic of the Congo where it occurs in the Kasai River drainage.  This species grows to a length of  TL.

References
 
 

Mochokidae
Catfish of Africa
Fish of Angola
Fish of the Democratic Republic of the Congo
Fish described in 1928